Antonio Catania (born 22 February 1952) is an Italian actor.

Life and career 
Born in Acireale, Province of Catania,  Antonio Catania studied acting at the Drama School of the Piccolo Teatro in Milan. After the graduation he started an intense stage career, often working with Gabriele Salvatores with the stage company  Compagnia dell'Elfo.

After several minor roles, in the 1990s Catania started obtaining more significant roles, in films directed by Silvio Soldini, Carlo Verdone, Leone Pompucci, Nanni Moretti and the same Salvatores. Catania is also active in television, notably in TV series Zanzibar and Boris.

Selected filmography 

 Mediterraneo (1991)
 Puerto Escondido (1992)
 Mille bolle blu (1993)
 Camerieri (1995)
 Bits and Pieces (1996)
 Vesna Goes Fast (1996)
 Penniless Hearts (1996)
 Physical Jerks (1997)
 Nirvana (1997)
 The Game Bag (1997) 
 The Dinner (1998) 
 That's Life (1998)
 Outlaw (1999) 
 Bread and Tulips (2000)
 This Is Not Paradise (2000)
 Ask Me If I'm Happy (2000)
 The Council of Egypt (2002)
 Bimba - È clonata una stella (2002)
 The Legend of Al, John and Jack (2002)
 It Can't Be All Our Fault (2003)
 Secret File (2003)
 Love Is Eternal While It Lasts (2004)
 The Bodyguard's Cure (2006)
 Night Bus (2007) 
 Paul VI: The Pope in the Tempest (2008) 
 The Worst Week of My Life (2011)
The Christmas Week of My Life (2012)
 Boris: The Film (2011)
 Them Who? (2015)
 Belli di papà (2015)
 When Mom Is Away (2019)
 Odissea nell'ospizio (2019)

References

External links 

1952 births
Living people
People from Acireale
Italian male stage actors
Nastro d'Argento winners
Italian male film actors
Italian male television actors
Actors from Sicily